Juan Carlos Baños (born October 16, 1972) is a Mexican professional wrestler or "Luchador" known as Lizmark Jr. or El Hijo de Lizmark (The Son of Lizmark). Baños previously worked for Consejo Mundial de Lucha Libre and AAA. Lizmark Jr. works as a Rudo and has been a part of the Los Perros del Mal stable.

Professional wrestling career
Lizmark Jr. is the son of the professional wrestler Lizmark, not just using the ring name as is at times the case in Lucha libre.  Lizmark was a big star in Mexico in the 1980s and 1990s. Outside of Mexico, Lizmark Jr. is probably best remembered for his stint in World Championship Wrestling (WCW) where he was part of the groups Cruiserweight division in the late 1990s. In the 2000s, Lizmark Jr. started working for Consejo Mundial de Lucha Libre (CMLL), Mexico's top wrestling promotion and the oldest promotion still active today. Lizmark Jr. turned rudo, joined up with Los Perros del Mal and has been moving up the ranks to main eventing on a regular basis. He forms "Team Tall" with Black Warrior and Rayo de Jalisco Jr., with them he won the Copa de Arena Mexico Tournament in 2002. On September 28, 2007, Lizmark Jr. lost his mask in the main event of the CMLL 74th Anniversary Show, in a match called "Infierno en el Ring" ("Hell in the Ring"). Lizmark Jr. was pinned by Blue Panther, in a match that also involved Místico, Dr. Wagner Jr., Perro Aguayo Jr., Atlantis, Último Guerrero and Villano V, and took place inside a Steel Cage. On December 12, 2010, Lizmark Jr. defeated Charly Malice, Marco Corleone and R. J. Brewer in a four-way elimination match to become the first-ever LLUSA Heavyweight Champion. On March 13, 2011, Lizmark Jr. returned to Lucha Libre AAA World Wide (AAA), after a sixteen-year absence, re-joining Los Perros del Mal.

Personal life
His father was the professional wrestler Lizmark, who died on December 16, 2015. He also has a brother, El Hijo de Lizmark.

Championships and accomplishments
American Independent Wrestling Alliance
AIWA World Heavyweight Championship (1 time)
Consejo Mundial de Lucha Libre
CMLL World G1 Heavyweight Champion (1 time)
Copa de Arena Mexico: 2002 – Black Warrior and Rayo de Jalisco Jr.
Leyenda de Azul: 2005
International Wrestling Revolution Group
Copa Higher Power (2011) – with Damián 666
Lucha Libre USA
LLUSA Heavyweight Championship (1 time)
Pro Wrestling Illustrated
PWI ranked him #141 of the 500 best singles wrestlers of the PWI 500 in 1997

Luchas de Apuestas record

Footnotes

References

External links
AAA profile

1972 births
Living people
Masked wrestlers
Mexican male professional wrestlers
Professional wrestlers from Guerrero
People from Acapulco